Tristan von Lahnstein is a fictional character of the German soap opera Verbotene Liebe (Forbidden Love). The character is played by actor Jens Hartwig. He first appeared on 23 October 2009.

Creation

Personality
Tristan is said to never miss a trick. He loves all the attention he gets and knew very early in his life how to use his charisma to get what he wants. Tristan enjoys playing little pranks. He takes pleasure in seeing other people speechless because of his actions. He is considered a bad boy in a gentleman's outfit. He loves women, and doesn't mind having more than one at a time. Tristan doesn't come off as a traditional villain or a character the audience should love to hate. His personality is complex enough to forgive him for his bad sides very easily and see him more as a little child that is out to play a little game with the other kids. Tristan is extremely close to his twin sister Helena (Renée Weibel). He feels that she is the only person in his life who loves him unconditionally and can give him the attention that he almost desperately seems to need. Their relationship comes off as very affectionate and almost incestuous. Both Helena and Tristan appear jealous when either of them gets romantically involved with someone else.

Introduction
With the arrival of Sebastian von Lahnstein in November 2007, it is mentioned that he has two other siblings. They're referenced to as the twins, without letting the audience know which gender they are. The twins get mentioned several times over two years. When Helena arrives at Castle Königsbrunn it finally gives one of the twins a face and a name. With her appearance it's been declared that she has a twin brother named Tristan. He is said to be in France with a woman he met several weeks ago. Helena mentions that it won't take long before Tristan will get bored with her and move on; saying she is expecting to see him very soon in Düsseldorf. He then shows up first at the local coffee bar NoLimits as a mysterious guy, who flirts with no other than the married Tanja von Anstetten (Miriam Lahnstein). Within the first few minutes it's declared that Tristan can use his charm to win women over and that he is well aware of it, which leaves an impression on Tanja.

Storylines
With his arrival in Düsseldorf, Tristan already makes an impression on the ladies world. When he walks in at the NoLimits, Tanja von Lahnstein accidentally mistakes him for a business partner she wants to hire as a thief. Tristan gets that Tanja was expecting someone else and tells her that he isn't the one she was waiting for, but he wouldn't mind having a drink with her anyway. When Tristan wants to order two glasses of champagne, the waitress Miriam Pesch seems to have lost her eyes in him, which Tanja addresses by Tristan. He tells her to be aware of that and smiles at Tanja, leaving the lady impressed with the stranger she just met. Tanja takes him with her to the penthouse, where they make out in the lift, before getting more comfortable at a table. The two share a passionate night together and Tanja couldn't be in a better mood the next morning. But it comes as a shock, when the stranger from last night shows up at Königsbrunn Castle and Tanja has to realize that she slept with her husband's cousin. Tristan also is very interested in his twin-sister's life. Helena seems to be someone on his side that he won't let easily go off. When Rebecca designs a dress for Helena, Tristan gets almost jealous that he brought her also a dress for an award celebration. Helena wants to wear Rebecca's dress, when Tristan does one of his little tricks and ruins the dress. Tristan's affection towards Helena doesn't go away, even though he continues his affair with Tanja. But after a passionate night with her, Tristan receives a warning from Ansgar to stay away from her. Meanwhile, it is shown that Rebecca doesn't accepts Tristan's behavior, leading to a sibling rivalry. Tristan's affair with Tanja ends as sudden as it started and Tristan becomes more obsessed with his sister's love life when Helena starts a relationship with Andi Fritzsche.

Tristan is determined to end Helena and Andi's relationship and plays several tricks on them. In the meanwhile Tristan distracts himself by having an affair with Jessica Stiehl who would love to marry into the wealthy clan. Tristan starts using Jessica for his schemes and the pair even goes as far as to imply that Andi raped Jessica at one point. Andi is called a rapist through the press and has to face a conviction. He eventually goes free when there is not enough evidence to prove the rape. Jessica slowly realizes how twisted Tristan's mind really works. She even calls off the engagement to him and the truth about the supposed rape is revealed. But not before Tristan makes a move on his sister and tries to kiss her. Tristan's father Ludwig wants to control the situation within the family and sends Tristan off to therapy.

When Tristan returns Helena has a hard time forgiving him. The relationship between them never seems to be the same again. Tristan tries to get his life in order and gets his own division of Lahnstein Enterprises. He also has a brief relationship with Dana Wolf which fails because of Dana's feelings for Tristan's brother Hagen. Tristan and his cousin Nico also take a short interest in one another but nothing comes of it. He then falls for Dana's sister Marlene, a musical actress that starts to work with him. Marlene and Tristan become engaged. But as the wedding day of Tristan and Marlene is about to arrive, Marlene has started an affair with Rebecca. Tristan becomes determined to ruin the relationship between the women and also tries to damage Marlene's career. After some time, Tristan gives up and eventually forgives Marlene and Rebecca.

Tristan sets his sights on Bella Jacob and again has a rival in Andi. Tristan and Bella start a relationship but it fails because of Tristan's schemes against Andi. He has to overcome a cocaine addiction. As the family is challenged by Vincent Berg, Tristan gets involved with his daughter Alexa. After Berg murders Ansgar's fiancée Eva Baumann, he has to pay with his life and is shot by Ansgar. Alexa claims to be a witness and wants Ansgar to go down for murdering her father. In order to get her to take her statement back, Tristan marries Alexa. She later kidnaps Ansgar and holds him hostage for weeks before remaining on the run from the police. Alexa contacts Tristan and wants him to go away with her but Tristan remains loyal to his family and ends things with her.

Reception
The character of Tristan got mixed reviews from fans and critics. His attraction to his sister Helena seemed "like an addiction that has to stop". With the hope that they don't write him into a corner with being jealous over his sister's love life, it's mentioned that the character seems "interesting and complex". His affair with Tanja was reviewed as "sexy scenes with a lot of chemistry between Jens Hartwig and Miriam Lahnstein". It was also mentioned that his affair with Tanja isn't something that should be a side-storyline and that the two would have the chance "to create the hottest couple on the show in a long time".

See also
Lahnstein family

References

External links
Das Erste Information about Tristan and the actor (German)
Deutsche-Dailys Character profile (German)
Deine Soaps Jens Hartwig in his role as Tristan (German)

Verbotene Liebe characters
Television characters introduced in 2009
Fictional counts and countesses
Fictional twins
Fictional criminals in soap operas